Euspondylus maculatus,  the spotted sun tegus, is a species of lizard in the family Gymnophthalmidae. It is found in Peru and Ecuador.

References

Euspondylus
Reptiles described in 1845
Taxa named by Johann Jakob von Tschudi